Adams Township is one of the nineteen townships of Guernsey County, Ohio, United States. As of the 2010 census the population was 2,036.

Geography
Located in the western part of the county, it borders the following townships:
Knox Township - north
Cambridge Township - east
Westland Township - south
Union Township, Muskingum County - southwest corner
Highland Township, Muskingum County - west
Monroe Township, Muskingum County - northwest corner

No municipalities are located in Adams Township.

Name and history
Adams Township was organized in 1827. It is one of ten Adams Townships statewide.

Government
The township is governed by a three-member board of trustees, who are elected in November of odd-numbered years to a four-year term beginning on the following January 1. Two are elected in the year after the presidential election and one is elected in the year before it. There is also an elected township fiscal officer, who serves a four-year term beginning on April 1 of the year after the election, which is held in November of the year before the presidential election. Vacancies in the fiscal officership or on the board of trustees are filled by the remaining trustees.

References

External links
County website

Townships in Guernsey County, Ohio
Townships in Ohio